Geoforum is a peer-reviewed academic journal of geography which focuses on social, political, economic, and environmental activities that occur around the globe within the context of geographical space and time.

Scope
The journal has a wide range of study areas including political governance and regulation, regional development, urban planning, and resource management. A Critical Review section assesses the articles published to allow for a balanced and up to date view of these topics.

Publisher
Geoforum is published by Elsevier as a 'paywalled.' non-Open Access publication. The current chief editors are Dr. Rob Fletcher from Wageningen University and Prof. Sarah Hall at the University of Nottingham. In recent years there have been significant efforts to gain significant Open Access and pricing concessions from this commercial publisher.  

As of 2018, articles rejected by the journal can be considered for Elsevier's open access, Author Pays megajournal, Heliyon. The Heliyon author fee in 2018 was $1,250 and $1,500 in 2019.

External links

References

Geography journals
Environmental social science journals
Elsevier academic journals
Bimonthly journals
Publications established in 1970
English-language journals